James Aitken Frecheville (born 14 April 1991) is an Australian actor known for his lead role in the Australian film Animal Kingdom as Joshua "J" Cody, a confused teenager and youngest member of a criminal family in Melbourne's underworld.

Early life
Frecheville was born in Melbourne and grew up in the suburb of Malvern East. He attended Lloyd Street Primary School as a child and was educated at McKinnon Secondary College as a teenager. He found a particular interest in drama and the arts at a young age and continued to excel in this field throughout his schooling life. Initially, Frecheville was involved with various youth theatre groups (mostly amateur theatre, including school productions) before starting work as an extra on the Australian television series City Homicide. Prior to his big break, Frecheville took part in a series of acting courses  at schools such as The Australian Film & Television Academy (TAFTA).

Film career
Auditions for Animal Kingdom took place in 2008 with about 500 young men competing for the lead role of "J" Cody. Filming started in 2009, causing some disruption to Frecheville's studies as a Year Twelve high school student. At the 2010 Sundance Film Festival (where the film won the World Cinema Jury Prize, Dramatic), The Hollywood Reporter described Frecheville as "a brilliant casting choice."

In preparation for his role in the 2018 film Black '47, Frecheville had to learn the Irish language. In an interview, he discussed the challenges of playing an Irish character and filming in Connemara, stating "It's hard to say where the challenge was because it was all challenging. It was all very cold. I'm not so good at learning languages so to pick up a language that not a great number of people speak was pretty tough, but apparently, I passed a few tests but I still have to see what the public thinks."

Filmography

References

External links

 

1991 births
21st-century Australian male actors
Australian male film actors
Australian male stage actors
Australian male television actors
Living people
Male actors from Melbourne
People from Malvern, Victoria